The Society of Texas Film Critics Awards were first awarded in 1994, when the Society of Texas Film Critics (STFC) was formed by 21 print, television, radio, and internet film critics working for different media outlets across the state of Texas. Over the course of four years, the size of the organization decreased, and the STFC disbanded in 1998.

Below are the award ceremonies from each of the four years.

1st Society of Texas Film Critics Awards (1994)

The 1st Society of Texas Film Critics Awards were given by the Society of Texas Film Critics (STFC) on December 17, 1994. The list of winners was announced by STFC founder Michael MacCambridge, then also a film critic for the Austin American-Statesman. The society's first meeting was held in the Representative Boardroom at the Omni Austin Hotel. Pulp Fiction took the top honor and a total of four awards, more than any other film, in this initial awards presentation.

Winners
 Best Film: 
 Pulp Fiction
 Best Director:
 Quentin Tarantino – Pulp Fiction
 Best Actor: 
 Samuel L. Jackson – Pulp Fiction
 Best Actress:
 Linda Fiorentino – The Last Seduction
 Best Supporting Actor: 
 Martin Landau – Ed Wood
 Best Supporting Actress: 
 Dianne Wiest – Bullets Over Broadway
 Best Screenplay:
 Quentin Tarantino & Roger Avary – Pulp Fiction
 Best Documentary Film:
 Hoop Dreams
 The Lone Star Award, recognizing the best Texas film of the year:
 Reality Bites

2nd Society of Texas Film Critics Awards (1995)

The 2nd Society of Texas Film Critics Awards were given by the STFC on December 28, 1995. The list of winners was announced by STFC president Joe Leydon. The Usual Suspects received four awards, more than any other film.

Winners
 Best Film: 
 The Usual Suspects
 Best Director:
 Bryan Singer – The Usual Suspects
 Best Actor: 
 Nicolas Cage – Leaving Las Vegas
 Best Actress:
 Emma Thompson – Carrington; Sense and Sensibility
 Best Supporting Actor: 
 Kevin Spacey – The Usual Suspects; Seven; Outbreak
 Best Supporting Actress: 
 Joan Allen – Nixon
 Best Original Screenplay:
 Christopher McQuarrie – The Usual Suspects
 Best Adapted Screenplay:
 Emma Thompson – Sense and Sensibility
 Best Foreign Language Film:
 Il Postino (The Postman) – Italy
 Best Documentary Film:
 Crumb
 Lone Star Award (for a motion picture filmed in part and/or set in Texas):
 Apollo 13

3rd Society of Texas Film Critics Awards (1996)

The 3rd Society of Texas Film Critics Awards were given by the STFC on December 19, 1996. The list of winners was announced by STFC president Joe Leydon.

Winners
Best Film: 
Fargo
Best Director:
John Sayles – Lone Star
Best Actor: 
Geoffrey Rush – Shine
Best Actress:
Frances McDormand – Fargo
Best Supporting Actor: 
Edward Norton – The People vs. Larry Flynt; Primal Fear
Best Supporting Actress: 
Miranda Richardson – The Evening Star; Kansas City
Best Original Screenplay:
John Sayles – Lone Star
Best Adapted Screenplay:
Anthony Minghella – The English Patient
Best Foreign Language Film:
Ridicule – France
Best Documentary Film:
Microcosmos

4th Society of Texas Film Critics Awards (1997)

The 4th Society of Texas Film Critics Awards were given by the Society of Texas Film Critics (STFC) on December 29, 1997.

Winners
 Best Film: 
 The Sweet Hereafter
 Best Director: 
 Atom Egoyan – The Sweet Hereafter
 Best Actor: 
 Robert Duvall – The Apostle
 Best Actress: 
 Helena Bonham Carter – The Wings of the Dove
 Best Supporting Actor: 
 Kevin Spacey – L.A. Confidential; Midnight in the Garden of Good and Evil
 Best Supporting Actress: 
 Joan Cusack – In & Out
 Best Original Screenplay: 
 In the Company of Men – Neil LaBute 
 Best Adapted Screenplay: 
 L.A. Confidential – Brian Helgeland and Curtis Hanson 
 Best Foreign Language Film: 
 Shall We Dance? (Shall we dansu?) – Japan 
 Best Documentary Feature: 
 Fast, Cheap & Out of Control

References

 
American film awards
Cinema of Texas